Aloe pretoriensis,  is a species of Aloe found discontinuously in northern South Africa, eastern Zimbabwe and eastern Eswatini. It occurs in rocky grassland at generally higher altitudes. It is not threatened, but human induced declines have occurred in the Bankenveld region of Gauteng. It flowers in winter and is pollinated by insects and birds. The pointy flowers are carried on elongated racemes on a decidedly tall and branched peduncle. They have a tight rosette of erect, pale green leaves, which are quite thin compared to other Aloe species. Drying leaf tips turn reddish.

References

External links
 
 

pretoriensis